José "Pepe" Checa Calvo (born 2 April 1985) is a Spanish tennis coach and former professional player.

Career
Born in the town of Las Pedroñeras, Checa is a product of the Cuenca Tennis Club, where he trained with his elder sisters. He began competing professionally in 2003. 

Checa won 21 ITF singles titles during his career. On the ATP Challenger Tour, Checa was a Montauban semi-finalist in 2006 and beat world number 78 Bjorn Phau at the Tampere Open in 2009. After winning six ITF titles in 2013, he attained a career high singles ranking of 230 in April, 2014. He never made an ATP Tour main draw but featured in several qualifying tournaments including the 2014 Torneo Godó (ATP Tour 500), beating Ante Pavić in the first round.

Forced to retire from professional tennis in 2015 due to injuries, Checa transitioned straight into a career as a tour coach, taking charge of Santiago Giraldo. In 2017 he parted company with Giraldo and became coach of Andrey Kuznetsov. He was the coach of Ilya Ivashka, who rose to 50 in the world under his charge.

ITF Futures titles

Singles: (21)

References

External links
 
 

1985 births
Living people
Spanish male tennis players
Spanish tennis coaches
Sportspeople from the Province of Cuenca